Gérard Jarlot (1923–1966) was a French journalist, screenwriter and novelist, winner of the Prix Médicis in 1963.

Jarlot met Marguerite Duras in 1957. She dedicated the novel Moderato cantabile to him. With her, he adapted the book and wrote the dialogues for Seven Days... Seven Nights directed by Peter Brook in 1960.

In 1960, he signed the Manifesto of the 121 entitled "Declaration on the Right to draft evasion in the Algerian War".

Work

Literature 
 1943: Le Périple d'Autun, short stories
 1946: Les Armes blanches, novel (Éditions Gallimard)
 1948: Un mauvais lieu, novel (Gallimard)
 1963: Un chat qui aboie, novel — Prix Médicis

Screenplays 
 1964: La Chambre (telefilm) by Michel Mitrani, in collaboration with Michel Mitrani
 1964: Sans merveille (telefilm) by Michel Mitrani
 1961-1963 :  by Jean Rollin, in collaboration with Marguerite Duras
 1961: The Long Absence by Henri Colpi, in collaboration with Marguerite Duras
 1960: Seven Days... Seven Nights by Peter Brook, in collaboration with Marguerite Duras

References

External links 
 

20th-century French non-fiction writers
20th-century French screenwriters
Prix Médicis winners
1923 births
1966 deaths